The 9th Airlift Squadron is a unit of the United States Air Force, part of the 436th Airlift Wing Air Mobility Command based at Dover Air Force Base, Delaware. It operates C-5M Galaxy aircraft supporting the United States Air Force global reach mission worldwide. The mission is to provide services and support which promote quality of life and project global power through combat-proven airlift and airdrop.

Mission
The 9th Airlift Squadron provides worldwide airlift to meet Department of Defense, Department of State and Presidential mobility requirements.

History

World War II
Constituted 9th Transport Squadron on 1 January 1938. Activated on 1 December 1940 at  Patterson Field, OH with C-34. Moved to Brookley Field, AL, 18 September 1941, then to Camp Williams, WI, 24 May 1942. Redesignated 9th Troop Carrier Squadron on 4 July 1942. Relocated to Dodd Field, TX, c. 18 Sep 1942; Stuttgart, AR, 11 Nov 1942; Victorville, CA, 18 December 1942; Ft Sumner AAFld, NM, 4 Mar 1943; Lawson Field, GA, 7 May 1943; Grenada AAFld, MS, c. 3 Jun 1943-17 Jan 1944; Hickam Field, TH, 21 Feb 1944; Abemama Island, 27 Mar 1944; Saipan, 4 Aug 1944; Guam, Jul-15 Oct 1946. 

The squadron provided aerial transportation in Central, Western, and Southwestern Pacific, during World War II.  Inactivated on 15 October 1946. 

Redesignated 9th Troop Carrier Squadron, Medium, on 10 May 1949. Activated in the Reserve on 27 Jun 1949 at Floyd Bennett NAS, NY, 27 June 1949-9 May 1951. Moved to Altus AFB, OK, 20 June 1953, with C-124. The 9th conducted replacement training through 1943, and subsequently aerial transportation in the Pacific Theater during World War II.

Strategic airlift
It has provided worldwide airlift since 1953.  The 9th resupplied scientific camps in Antarctica from 1959–1961, and 1965–1968. Relocated to Dover AFB, DE, 1 January 1965. Redesignated 9th Military Airlift Squadron on 8 January 1966. It also flew missions to Southeast Asia from 1965–1968 with C-141 Starlifters, discontinued, and inactivated, on 8 September 1968. Activated on 1 April 1971, with C-5 Galaxys. Participated in the evacuation of refugees from Southeast Asia in April 1975.  The squadron supported operations in Grenada, 24 October 1983 – 11 December 1983; Panama, 19 December 1989 – 14 January 1990; and Southwest Asia, August 1990–July 1991. Redesignated 9th Airlift Squadron on 1 December 1991.

The last C-5B left the squadron on March 12, 2012. The 9th Airlift Squadron is now a C-5M Super Galaxy exclusive unit.

Lineage
 Constituted as the 9th Transport Squadron on 1 January 1938
 Activated on 1 December 1940
 Redesignated 9th Troop Carrier Squadron on 4 July 1942
 Inactivated on 15 October 1946
 Redesignated 9th Troop Carrier Squadron, Medium on 10 May 1949
 Activated in the reserve on 27 June 1949
 Ordered to active service on 1 May 1951
 Inactivated on 9 May 1951
 Redesignated 9th Troop Carrier Squadron, Heavy on 19 March 1953
 Activated on 20 June 1953
 Discontinued and inactivated on 18 January 1963
 Activated on 13 November 1964 (not organized)
 Organized on 1 January 1965
 Redesignated 9th Military Airlift Squadron on 8 January 1966
 Discontinued and inactivated on 8 September 1968
 Activated on 1 April 1971
 Redesignated 9th Airlift Squadron on 1 December 1991

Assignments

 63d Transport Group (later 63d Troop Carrier Group), 1 December 1940
 Seventh Air Force, 3 February 1944
 VI Air Service Area Command, 25 July 1945
 Army Air Forces, Middle Pacific, 15 December 1945
 Pacific Air Command, United States Army, 1 January 1946
 Far East Air Service Command, 9 January 1946
 54th Troop Carrier Wing, 15 January 1946
 374th Troop Carrier Group, c. February 1946

 54th Troop Carrier Wing, 15 May 1946
 403d Troop Carrier Group, 31 May–15 October 1946
 63d Troop Carrier Group, 27 June 1949 – 9 May 1951
 63d Troop Carrier Group, 20 June 1953 – 18 January 1963
 Military Air Transport Service, 13 November 1964 (not organized)
 1607th Air Transport Wing, 1 January 1965
 436th Military Airlift Wing, 8 January 1966 – 8 September 1968
 436th Military Airlift Wing, 1 April 1971
 436th Operations Group, 1 December 1991 – present

Stations

 Patterson Field, Ohio, 1 December 1940
 Brookley Field, Alabama, 18 September 1941
 Camp Williams, Wisconsin, 24 May 1942
 Dodd Field, Texas, c. 18 September 1942
 Stuttgart Army Air Field, Arkansas, 11 November 1942
 Victorville Army Air Field, California, 18 December 1942
 Fort Sumner Army Air Field, New Mexico, 4 March 1943
 Lawson Field, Georgia, 7 May 1943
 Grenada Army Air Field, Mississippi, c. 3 June 1943 – 17 January 1944

 Hickam Field, Hawaii, 21 February 1944
 Abemama Island, 27 March 1944
 East Field (Saipan), Mariana Islands, 4 August 1944
 Agana Airfield, Guam, Marianas Islands, July–15 October 1946
 Floyd Bennett Naval Air Station, New York, 27 June 1949 – 9 May 1951
 Altus Air Force Base, Oklahoma, 20 June 1953
 Donaldson Air Force Base, South Carolina, 15 October 1953 – 18 January 1963
 Dover Air Force Base, Delaware, 1 January 1965 – 8 September 1968
 Dover Air Force Base, Delaware, 1 April 1971 – present

Aircraft

 Douglas C-33 (1940–1941)
 Douglas C-34 (1940–1941)
 Douglas C-39 (1940–1941)
 Douglas C-47 Skytrain (1942–1946, 1949–1951)
 Douglas C-50 (1942)
 Douglas C-53 Skytrooper (1942–1943)
 Curtiss C-46 Commando (1945–1946)
 Douglas C-54 Skymaster (1946)
 Douglas C-124 Globemaster II (1953–1963, 1965-1966)
 Lockheed C-141 Starlifter (1966–1968)
 Lockheed C-5A Galaxy (1971–unknown)
 Lockheed C-5B Galaxy (unknown–2012)
 Lockheed C-5M Super Galaxy (2009–present)

Operations
Operation Neptune
Operation Deep Freeze
Operation Urgent Fury
Operation Just Cause
Operation Desert Storm
Operation Iraqi Freedom/Operation New Dawn
Operation Enduring Freedom

References

Notes
 Explanatory notes

 Citations

Bibliography

 
 
 
 

0009
Military units and formations in Delaware